Killeen Castle may refer to:

Killeen Castle, Dunsany is a castle near Dunshaughlin, County Meath, Republic of Ireland. 
Killeen Castle, Castlegar is a castle in Castlegar, County Galway, Republic of Ireland.